Fight for Your Lady is a 1937 American comedy film directed by Benjamin Stoloff and written by Ernest Pagano, Harry Segall and Harold Daniel Kusel. The film stars John Boles, Jack Oakie, Ida Lupino, Margot Grahame, Gordon Jones, Erik Rhodes, Billy Gilbert and Paul Guilfoyle. The film was released on November 5, 1937, by RKO Pictures.

Plot

"Honest" Ham Hamilton needs money. A wrestling promoter in London, he places a wager and tells his champion Mike Scanlon to lose on purpose, but Mike wins anyway to impress Marcia Trent, an actress who has bet on him to win.

Hamilton ingratiates himself with Marcia and her betrothed, singer Robert Densmore, then sees Robert become suicidally depressed after Marcia leaves him for Mike. On a night In Budapest, a drunken Robert is persuaded by equally inebriated reporter Jim Trask make a play for a nightclub singer, Marietta, and incur the wrath of her jealous beau, Spadissimo. He will be challenged to a duel and that will grant Robert's wish to die.

Trouble ensues when Marietta becomes genuinely attracted to Robert and lies that his mother desperately needs him. Spadissimo takes pity until Marcia informs him Robert has no mother. The duel is on until Hamilton throws himself at the swordsman's mercy on Robert's behalf, disguised as his mother.

Cast 
 John Boles as Robert Densmore
 Jack Oakie as Honest Hamilton
 Ida Lupino as Marietta
 Margot Grahame as Marcia Trent
 Gordon Jones as Mike Scanlon
 Erik Rhodes as Anton Spadissimo
 Billy Gilbert as Boris 
 Paul Guilfoyle as Paris Tribune Reporter Jim Trask
 Georges Renavent as Joris 
 Charles Judels as Felix Janos
 Maude Eburne as Nadya
 Charles Coleman as Densmore's Butler
 Leona Roberts as Cleaning Woman
 Forrester Harvey as Referee

References

External links 
 
 
 
 

1937 films
American black-and-white films
RKO Pictures films
Films directed by Benjamin Stoloff
1937 comedy films
American comedy films
1930s English-language films
1930s American films